Revelation 17 is the seventeenth chapter of the Book of Revelation or the Apocalypse to John in the New Testament of the Christian Bible. The book is traditionally attributed to John the Apostle, but the precise identity of the author remains a point of academic debate. This chapter describes the judgment of the Whore of Babylon ("Babylon the Harlot").

Text
The original text was written in Koine Greek. This chapter is divided into 18 verses.

Textual witnesses
Some early manuscripts containing the text of this chapter are among others:
Papyrus 47 (3rd century; extant verses 1-2)
Codex Sinaiticus (330-360)
Codex Alexandrinus (400-440)

The vision of the harlot (17:1–6a)

Verse 1
 Then one of the seven angels who had the seven bowls came and talked with me, saying [to me], “Come, I will show you the judgment of the great harlot who sits on many waters,"
"One of the seven angels": provides a characteristic literary link to the previous chapter. Heinrich Meyer disagrees: "It is in no way to be conjectured which of the vial-angels it was".

The words "to me" do not appear in Codex Alexandrinus or in the Vulgate translation.

Verse 2
with whom the kings of the earth committed fornication, and the inhabitants of the earth were made drunk with the wine of her fornication.”

Verse 5

And on her forehead a name was written:
MYSTERY, BABYLON THE GREAT,
THE MOTHER OF HARLOTS
AND OF THE ABOMINATIONS
OF THE EARTH.The King James Version, New King James Version, and Young's Literal Translation (1862) include the word 'mystery' (or 'secret' - YLT) within her title, but in many other English translations the word is descriptive of the name: "a name of mystery" (Revised Standard Version, English Standard Version), "a name that has a secret meaning" (Good News Bible).

Verse 6I saw the woman, drunk with the blood of the saints and with the blood of the martyrs of Jesus.And when I saw her, I marveled with great amazement.This verse contains two descriptions of Christians which seem to refer to the same group (not two groups) of people.

The interpretation of the harlot (17:6b–18)
In response to John's astonishment at the vision of the harlot, an interpretation is given as much about the beast as about the harlot, because 'her fate is closely related to the career of the beast'.

Verse 8The beast, which you saw, was, and is not, and is to ascend out of the bottomless pit and go to destruction. Those who dwell on the earth whose names are not written in the Book of Life from the foundation of the world will marvel when they see the beast that was, and is not, and is to come.Whereas one of Revelation's key designations for God is the term 'the one who was and who is and who is to come' (1:4, 8), in this verse the beast is twice described in a similar term, but with the significant different in the middle which is negative: 'is not', because unlike God, the beast is not eternal and his second coming "will prove a fraud" and "go to destruction".

Verse 9Here is the mind which has wisdom: The seven heads are seven mountains on which the woman sits."Seven mountains": The definition of the mountains with the seven heads makes an unequivocal identification with Rome, 'which is famous for its seven hills'.

Verse 10There are also seven kings. Five have fallen, one is, and the other has not yet come. And when he comes, he must continue a short time. 
"Seven kings": is better to be recognized as the number of completeness, because the attempts to use this passage to identify the ruling Roman emperor when the Book of Revelation was written fail due to the impossibility to know 'from which emperor the counting should begin or whether all emperors should be counted'. It represents 'the complete sequence of kings', but not yet quite at the end because there is 'one short reign' still to come.
"A short time": or "a little while": is 'the conventional period of eschatological imminence' (cf. 6:11; Heb 10:37).

Verse 11The beast that was, and is not, is himself also the eighth, and is of the seven, and is going to perdition."Perdition": or "destruction".
 
Verse 16
 And the ten horns which you saw on the beast, these will hate the harlot, make her desolate and naked, eat her flesh and burn her with fire."Naked": compare to allusions in the Old Testament: ; .

Verse 17
 For God hath put in their hearts to fulfil his will, and to agree, and give their kingdom unto the beast, until the words of God shall be fulfilled.Verse 18
 And the woman which thou sawest is that great city, which reigneth over the kings of the earth.''

See also
 Book of Daniel
 Jesus Christ
 John's vision of the Son of Man
 Names and titles of Jesus in the New Testament
 Whore of Babylon
 Related Bible parts: Isaiah 47, Ezekiel 16, Zechariah 12, Revelation 4, Revelation 6, Revelation 13, Revelation 14, Revelation 15, Revelation 16

Notes

References

Bibliography

External links
 King James Bible - Wikisource
English Translation with Parallel Latin Vulgate 
Online Bible at GospelHall.org (ESV, KJV, Darby, American Standard Version, Bible in Basic English)
Multiple bible versions at Bible Gateway (NKJV, NIV, NRSV etc.)

17
Whore of Babylon